Microcylloepus is a genus of riffle beetles in the family Elmidae. There are about 9 described species in Microcylloepus.

Species
 Microcylloepus angustus Hinton, 1940
 Microcylloepus browni (Hatch, 1938)
 Microcylloepus formicoideus Shepard, 1990 (furnace creek riffle beetle)
 Microcylloepus inaequalis (Sharp, 1882)
 Microcylloepus moapus La Rivers, 1949
 Microcylloepus obesus Hinton, 1940
 Microcylloepus pusillus (Leconte, 1852)
 Microcylloepus similis Horn
 Microcylloepus thermarum (Darlington, 1928)

References

Further reading

 
 
 

Elmidae